The Best of Hank Locklin is a compilation album by American country singer–songwriter Hank Locklin. It was released in August 1966 via RCA Victor Records and contained 12 tracks of re-released material. The album was a collection of Locklin's biggest hit songs up to that point. It was his second compilation record for the RCA Victor label. The album received positive reviews following its release.

Background, release and reception
After Hank Locklin signed with RCA Victor Records in the late 1950s, he had his greatest commercial success. He had several major hits with songs like "Send Me the Pillow You Dream On," "Geisha Girl" and the crossover hit "Please Help Me, I'm Falling". RCA released a series of studio recordings during the 1960s following his success. The Best of Hank Locklin was his first compilation release for the label. 

The compilation contained a total of 12 tracks. Contained on the album were Locklin's previous hits "Please Help Me, I'm Falling", "Send Me the Pillow You Dream On", "Geisha Girl", "It's a Little More Like Heaven", "From Here to There to You", "Happy Journey", "Flying South", and a remake of 1953's "Let Me Be the One." Other tracks on the album were not originally released as a singles, with the exception of "I Was Coming Home to You". 

The Best of Hank Locklin was released in August 1966. It was Locklin's second compilation album issued in his career and his second with RCA Victor. The album was issued as a vinyl LP, containing six tracks on both sides. It received a 2.5 star rating from Eugene Chadbourne of AllMusic, who considered some of the album's tracks to be "bloated by choruses and string sections." Nonetheless, he concluded the review positively by saying, "Some listeners may find the Locklin repertoire a bit on the sentimental side; the point is, he had both the voice and the passion to pull off this kind of material -- even "Danny Boy." This is a nice collection; the four Locklin collections advertised on the back cover are even better bets."

Track listing

Release history

References

1966 compilation albums
Albums produced by Chet Atkins
Hank Locklin albums
RCA Victor albums